The white-naped crane (Antigone vipio) is a bird of the crane family.

Distribution
The white-naped crane breeds in northeastern Mongolia, northeastern China, and adjacent areas of southeastern Russia, where a program at Khingan Nature Reserve raises eggs provided from U.S. zoos to bolster the species. Different groups of the birds migrate to winter near the Yangtze River, the Korean Demilitarized Zone, and on Kyūshū in Japan. They also reach Kazakhstan and Taiwan. Only about 4,900 to 5,400 individuals remain in the wild.

Its diet consists mainly of insects, seeds, roots, plants, and small animals.

Due to ongoing habitat loss and overhunting in some areas, the white-naped crane is evaluated as vulnerable on the IUCN Red List of Threatened Species. It is listed on Appendix I and II of CITES.
In South Korea, it has been designated natural monument 203.

Taxonomy
The white-naped crane was formerly placed in the genus Grus, but a molecular phylogenetic study published in 2010 found that the genus, as then defined, was polyphyletic. In the resulting rearrangement to create monophyletic genera, four species, including the white-naped crane, were placed in the resurrected genus Antigone that had originally been erected by German naturalist Ludwig Reichenbach in 1853.

Gallery

References

External links 

 BirdLife Species Factsheet
 International crane Foundation
 White-naped Crane (Grus vipio) from Cranes of the World (1983) by Paul Johnsgard

 

Antigone (genus)
Taxa named by Peter Simon Pallas
Birds of Manchuria
Birds described in 1811
Taxobox binomials not recognized by IUCN